Dil is a 1990 Indian Hindi-language romantic drama film, starring Aamir Khan, Madhuri Dixit, Anupam Kher,  and Saeed Jaffrey. It was directed by Indra Kumar, written by Naushir Khatau and Kamlesh Pandey, with music composed by Anand–Milind.

Dil was released on the 15th of June 1990, clashing with the Sunny Deol-starrer Ghayal, and became the highest-grossing film of the year. It received positive reviews from critics upon release, with praise for its soundtrack and performances of the cast.

At the 36th Filmfare Awards, Dil received 8 nominations, including Best Film, Best Actor (Khan) and Best Supporting Actor (Kher), with Dixit winning her first Best Actress award for her performance in the film.

The film was remade in Telugu in 1993 under the title Tholi Muddhu; in Odia as  Agni Parikshya (1995). It was also remade in Bangladesh in 1997 under the title Amar Ghor Amar Behesht. The film was also remade in Kannada as Shivaranjini. The film was the highest-grossing film of the year.

Plot
Hazari Prasad, an absolute miser wants a rich woman's marriage proposal for his son Raja, a college student and spendthrift interested in spending money on wild parties.
Raja meets the beautiful and arrogant Madhu Mehra. Enraged by her, he misleads her that he is blind. He mocks her when she finds out, and they quickly prank on each other.

Hazari looks for a bride with large dowry for Raja. He finds his involvement in wastepaper business makes Raja a less-than-stellar marriage prospect. Accidentally, he runs into Madhu's rich father Durgesh. Hazari gives beggars large quantity of money to masquerade as wealthy acquaintances. He befriends Durgesh, deciding alliance for Raja and Madhu, but when the two find the truth, they disagree to their fathers.

On a weekend college retreat, Madhu falsely accuses Raja of trying to rape her. With his reputation ruined, he reprimands her for her dishonesty, saying many take revenge but he is different. Madhu instantly falls for Raja who now develops love for her too. Durgesh discovers Hazari's true circumstances; he insults him who takes offense. Raja and Madhu are forbidden by them to see each other again. Nevertheless, Raja and Madhu secretly meet.

When Durgesh finds this, he pays thugs to beat Raja who however sneaks into Mehra house and marries Madhu. Durgesh banishes her from the house. Hazari also disowns Raja, who moves into a small shack with Madhu and works as a constructionist. Despite their poverty, they live happily until Raja is hurt at construction site. Madhu leaves to beg Hazari for money to pay an emergency operation.

He agrees, only if she divorces Raja. Hazari removes her wedding necklace. Madhu returns to Durgesh and is forgiven but he orders her to never see Raja. When he recovers, Hazari lies that Madhu never visited him at the hospital. Believing Madhu deserted him, Raja returns to his home.

His mother Savitri reveals that Madhu was blackmailed by Hazari. Raja rushes to stop Madhu from taking a plane to London but is late as it takes off. Luckily, she didn't take the plane and meets him. They reunite and everyone live happily, as Hazari and Durgesh repent for their deeds.

Cast
 Aamir Khan as Raja Prasad
 Madhuri Dixit as Madhu Mehra Prasad
 Anupam Kher as Hazari Prasad
 Padmarani as Savitri Prasad
 Saeed Jaffrey as Durgesh Mehra
 Shammi as Malini Mehra
 Adi Irani as Shakti
 Deven Verma as Inspector Ghalib
 Satyendra Kapoor as Girdhari Laal
 Rajesh Puri as Pandit Ji
 Kishore Bhanushali as Dev
 Dinesh Hingoo as Pandu Prakashan
 Ajit Vachani as Potential in law of Hazari Prasad

Soundtrack

The lyrics of all songs were written by Sameer, and the music was composed by Anand-Milind. The song "O Priyaa Priyaa" was originally composed by Ilaiyaraaja, and originally sung by Chithra & S. P. Balasubrahmanyam in the Telugu film Geethanjali.

The film's soundtrack album sold 5million cassettes, making it one of the best-selling Bollywood music albums at the time, along with Maine Pyar Kiya (1989).

Awards and nominations
At the 36th Filmfare Awards the film won one award out of eight nominations.

References

External links
 

1990 films
1990s Hindi-language films
1990 romantic drama films
Indian romantic comedy-drama films
1990s romantic comedy-drama films
Films directed by Indra Kumar
Films scored by Anand–Milind
Hindi films remade in other languages
1990 directorial debut films
Films shot in Ooty
1990 drama films